Events in 2019 in Japanese television.

Events

Ongoing

New series and returning shows

Ending

Sports Events

Special events and milestone episodes

Deaths

References